Obrowo  is a village in Toruń County, Kuyavian-Pomeranian Voivodeship, in north-central Poland. It is the seat of the gmina (administrative district) called Gmina Obrowo.

The village has a population of 1,322.

References

Villages in Toruń County
Płock Governorate
Warsaw Voivodeship (1919–1939)
Pomeranian Voivodeship (1919–1939)